Pačariz is a family name in the region of Sandžak. It is derived from the Turkish language and means damage, difficulty, or mess. 

This last name is often concentrated in the Sandžak region of Serbia/Montenegro, specifically in Prijepolje.

See also
Sulejman Pačariz (1900-1945), Islamic cleric and Muslim commander

References

Bosnian surnames
Serbian surnames
Croatian surnames